David Costa (born 18 November 1947) is an English graphic designer, art director and musician.  Notable design collaborations include those for Queen, Elton John, Eric Clapton, George Harrison, The Beatles, The Moody Blues, Genesis, The Rolling Stones and Phil Collins.

Early life

Costa was born in London, England. His grandfather was a songwriter and pianist with the Savoy Orpheans. His father was the singer and radio presenter Sam Costa. He attended Merchant Taylors' public school, pursuing Fine Arts at the University of East Anglia in 1966.

Career
In early 1969 he left university and brought together Barry Clarke, Bias Boshell, Unwin Brown and Celia Humphris to form the folk-rock band Trees, subsequently recording two albums: The Garden of Jane Delawney and On the Shore.  In 1971 he left Trees to pursue freelance graphic design, eventually with Dick James Music in 1972, leading to a sequence of album sleeves for Elton John, and subsequently as art director in the UK offices of Rocket Records. During this period, Costa and guitarist Barry Clarke went on to write, record and produce the band Casablanca and subsequent eponymous album in 1973.

Throughout the 1970s and 1980s freelance design projects included work with ex-Beatles press officer Derek Taylor to instigate the "Brighton Pier" label for Warner Bros. Records UK. From 1977 through 1979 Costa ran his studio Jubilee Graphics from the previous offices of the Rocket Record Company in Wardour Street, London. Over the ensuing decade he worked as a freelance designer/art director on the re-launched Tatler magazine with Tina Brown; redesign and art direction on the relaunched The Field magazine; early visual proposals for Today, Eddie Shah's publication that pioneered the use of computer systems with photo-typesetting and full-colour offset printing, and, the redesign and frequent illustration of covers for Encounter magazine.

Discography

Musician

Graphic art, design and packaging

Books

Graphic art, design and packaging

Tour programmes and books

References

1947 births
Living people
English art directors
English graphic designers
English male musicians
English people of Portuguese-Jewish descent
Designers from London
People from Westminster
People educated at Merchant Taylors' School, Northwood
Trees (folk band) members